Ranveig is a given name. Notable people with the name include:

Ranveig Frøiland (1945–2020), Norwegian politician
Ranveig Narbuvold, Norwegian ski-orienteering competitor

Norwegian feminine given names